Chetti Bhanumurti (born 23 February 1888; died 6 January 1973) was a Hymn Writer whose hymns are found in the Hymnal in Telugu. Bhanumurti was a Pastor of the Canadian Baptist Mission/Convention of Baptist Churches of Northern Circars who also led the Principalship of the Baptist Theological Seminary, Kakinada from 1945-1956 leading to its affiliation to the nation's first University, Senate of Serampore College (University) in 1946

Comparative religion Scholar R. R. Sundara Rao who researched at the University of Wisconsin–Madison highlighted the literary standard of Chetty Bhanumurti terming him as a pioneer hymn writer whose songs had the element of Bhakti. The Old Testament Scholar, Victor Premasagar was also enthused by the lyrical content in Bhanumurti's compositions, especially Hymn Number 94 titled Yesuku Samanulevaru (Translated Who is equal to you Lord?) with direct reference to Psalm 71:19 and strikingly similar to Tyagaraja's composition in Kharaharapriya. Dayanandan Francis brings Chetti Bhanumurti in the line of another Hymn writer, Puroshottam Choudhary and writes,

Studies
In 1915, Bhanumurthy discerned his avocation towards priesthood and went for ministerial formation to the Serampore College, Serampore, a constituent College of the nation's first University, studying up to 1918, during the Principalship of George Howells, as a candidate of the Canadian Baptist Mission/Convention of Baptist Churches of Northern Circars where Bhanumurthy obtained a Licentiate in Theology (L.Th.).

Theological Teacher
Bhanumurthy taught at the Ramayapatnam Baptist Theological Seminary in Ramayapatnam and later on moved to Kakinada where he taught at the Baptist Theological Seminary in Kakinada along with Muthyala Theophilus who was his colleague.  This was the period when A. B. Masilamani joined the seminary for spiritual formation.  In 1952, Bhanumurthy became Principal of the seminary.

Hymns
Roger E. Hedlund, the Missiologist writes that along with the Bible, the Christian Hymnal in Telugu also forms the main bulwark of Christian spiritual life for the Telugu folk and of equal use to both the non-literates and the literates as well.  In such a context, it is noteworthy that sixteen of Bhanumurthy's compositions are found in the Christian Hymnal in Telugu with the following sequence,

 9, Stuti Geethamu,
 84, Neeti Suryudu,
 87, Kreesthuku Namo Namo,
 92, Yesu Sharanu,
 94, Yesuku Samanulevaru,
 116, Raraju Janmadinamu,
 198, Siluva Balamu,
 201, Yesu Shanthikarudu,
 263, Kreesthu Sanghamunaku Sirassu,
 361, Yesunaku Sakshulu,
 406, Kreesthuni Vembadinchuta,
 514, Kutumbaradhana,
 522, Melukolupu,
 524, Kraistava Yuvajanulara Kreesthu Koraku Nelavandi,
 552, Abhinaya Christmas Geethamu,
 579, Kruthagnathala Panduga,

References

1888 births
1973 deaths
Singers from Andhra Pradesh
Telugu people
Telugu-language writers
20th-century Baptist ministers
Christian clergy from Andhra Pradesh
Indian Christian theologians
Senate of Serampore College (University) alumni
Academic staff of the Senate of Serampore College (University)
Indian Baptist ministers
Sacred music composers
Baptist hymnwriters
Convention of Baptist Churches of Northern Circars
Canadian Baptist Ministries
20th-century Indian male singers
20th-century Indian singers